Conroe Independent School District (CISD) is a school district in Montgomery County, Texas. The district's headquarters are located in the Deane L. Sadler Administration/Technology  Center in Conroe.

In 2005, CISD enrolled displaced Louisianans from the areas affected by Hurricane Katrina who were residing in the Conroe ISD boundaries.

CISD has its own police department of over 41 officers. As of 2007, CISD PD is run by Chief William Harness.

For the 2018–2019 school year, the district received a score of 89 out of 100 from the Texas Education Agency.

History 
The first school within Conroe ISD's current boundaries was built in 1886 and called, "Conroe Mill School." The building had one room and was open for five months each year. A school for African American students was started soon after inside a Baptist church. The school district was created on July 12, 1892 by order of the Commissioners Court of Montgomery County, who appointed the County Judge and three trustees to oversee the district's operations. A new school was built in 1899 and initially housed 10 grades.  In 1902, one male and three females were the first students to receive high school diplomas. In 1911, taxpayers approved a $25,000 bond for the construction of the district's first brick building, the JOH Bennette school. In 1925, the Texas State Legislature expanded the size of the district from 25 to 333 square miles. The oldest school still in operation is Travis Intermediate School, formerly Crockett High School, built in 1926. In 1954, Booker T. Washington High School opened as a school for African American students. Crockett High School students were moved to the current Conroe High School campus in 1964. From 1968–1969, Conroe ISD's campuses were desegregated.

Service area
It serves most of the city of Conroe, and the cities of Cut and Shoot, Oak Ridge North, Shenandoah, and the town of Woodloch. It also serves unincorporated communities, including almost all of The Woodlands (extreme south and west parts of The Woodlands are located in Tomball ISD and Magnolia ISD, respectively), the settlement of Tamina, the community of River Plantation, and a portion of the Porter Heights CDP. It also includes the former city of Chateau Woods.

Schools

Conroe High School feeder 

The Conroe High School attendance zone serves most of the city of Conroe as well as an area of unincorporated Montgomery County surrounding the city, including the community of River Plantation.

High schools (9–12) 
 Conroe High School and Conroe High School 9th Grade Campus
 Academy of Science & Health Professions

Junior high schools (7–8) 
 John V. Peet Junior High School
 Dr. Donald Stockton Junior High School

Intermediate schools (5–6) 
 Oree Bozman Intermediate school
 Cryar Intermediate School
 Travis Intermediate School

Flex schools (PK–6) 
 Jean E. Stewart Elementary School
 Annette Gordon-Reed Elementary School

Elementary schools (PK–4) 
 Anderson Elementary School
 Neil Armstrong Elementary School
 Giesinger Elementary School
 Sam Houston Elementary School
 Charlie L Patterson Elementary School
 O. A. Reaves Elementary School
 B. B. Rice Elementary School
 J. W. Runyan Elementary School
 Wilkinson Elementary School

Oak Ridge High School feeder 

The Oak Ridge High School attendance zone serves the city of Oak Ridge North, a portion of the city of Shenandoah, and the unincorporated communities of Spring, Imperial Oaks, and Tamina.

High schools (9–12) 
 Oak Ridge High School and Oak Ridge High School 9th Grade Campus
Academy for Careers in Engineering and Science

Junior high schools (7–8) 
 Gerald D. Irons Sr. Junior High School

Intermediate schools (5–6) 
 Dolly Vogel Intermediate School

Flex schools (PK–6) 
 David & Sheree Suchma Elementary School

Elementary schools (PK–4) 
 A. Davis Ford Elementary School (partial - some students zoned to Grand Oaks)
 Emmit E. Houser Elementary School (partial - some students zoned to College Park)
 George C. Kaufman III Elementary School
 Oak Ridge Elementary School

Caney Creek High School feeder 

The Caney Creek High School attendance zone serves a large section of Montgomery County east of Conroe, including the city of Cut and Shoot, the unincorporated community of Grangerland, and a portion of Porter Heights.

High schools (9–12) 
 Caney Creek High School

Junior high schools (7–8) 
 Moorhead Junior High School

Intermediate schools (5–6) 
 Grangerland Intermediate School

Elementary schools (PK–4) 
 Stephen F. Austin Elementary School 
 Gerald J. Creighton Jr. Elementary School
 Ruben W. Hope Jr. Elementary School
 Ben Milam Elementary School
 San Jacinto Elementary School

The Woodlands High School feeder 

The Woodlands High School attendance zone serves the western portion of The Woodlands as well as a small portion of southern Conroe.

High schools (9–12) 
 The Woodlands High School and The Woodlands High School 9th Grade Campus

Junior high schools (7–8) 
 McCullough Junior High School

Intermediate schools (5–6) 
 George P. Mitchell Intermediate School
 W. O. Wilkerson Intermediate School (partial - some students zoned to College Park)

Flex schools (PK–6) 
 Joel L. Deretchin Elementary School
 Coulson Tough Elementary School

Elementary schools (PK–4) 
 Don A. Buckalew Elementary School (partial - some students zoned to College Park)
 Barbara Pierce Bush Elementary School
 Roger L. Galatas Elementary School (partial - some students zoned to College Park)
 Glen Loch Elementary School (partial - some students zoned to College Park)
 Colin Powell Elementary School (partial - some students zoned to College Park)

The Woodlands College Park High School feeder 

The Woodlands College Park High School attendance zone serves the eastern portion of The Woodlands as well as a portion of the city of Shenandoah.

High schools (9–12) 
 The Woodlands College Park High School
 Academy of Science & Technology

Junior high schools (7–8) 
 Neal Knox Junior High School

Intermediate schools (5–6) 
 Collins Intermediate School
 W. O. Wilkerson Intermediate School (partial - some students zoned to The Woodlands HS)

Elementary schools (PK–4) 
 Don A. Buckalew Elementary School (partial - some students zoned to The Woodlands HS)
 David Elementary School
 National Blue Ribbon School in 2000–01
 Roger L. Galatas Elementary School (partial - some students zoned to The Woodlands HS)
 Glen Loch Elementary School (partial - some students zoned to The Woodlands HS)
 Sam K. Hailey Elementary School
 Emmit E. Houser Elementary School (partial - some students zoned to Oak Ridge)
 Lamar Elementary School
 Colin Powell Elementary School (partial - some students zoned to The Woodlands HS)
 Sally K. Ride Elementary School

Grand Oaks High School feeder 

The Grand Oaks High School attendance zone serves an area of unincorporated Montgomery County near Spring.

High schools (9–12) 
 Grand Oaks High School

Junior high schools (7–8) 
 C.D York Junior High School

Intermediate schools (5–6) 
 Katherine J. Clark Intermediate School
 Tom Cox Intermediate School

Elementary schools (PK–4) 
 Birnham Woods Elementary School
 Lucille J. Bradley Elementary School
 Sue Park Broadway Elementary School
 A. Davis Ford Elementary School (partial - some students zoned to Oak Ridge)
 Ann K. Snyder Elementary School

Other schools 
 Washington High School - Alternative school
 Juvenile Justice Alternative Education Program (JJAEP) - Montgomery County operates the program in partnership with CISD.

See also 

List of school districts in Texas

References

External links 
 Conroe ISD

School districts in Montgomery County, Texas
Conroe, Texas
School districts established in 1892